External granular layer may refer to:

 External granular layer of the cerebellar cortex
 External granular layer of the cerebral cortex